The Tune Twisters was an American jazz vocal trio founded in 1934 as The Freshmen by Andy Love, Robert "Bob" Wacker, and Jack Lathrop, who also played guitar. They were featured on radio broadcasts and recorded with jazz artists that included (i) Ray Noble in 1935 (with Noble, the Tune Twisters were initially known as "The Freshmen"), (ii) Bob Crosby in 1935, (iii) Glenn Miller in 1937, and (iv) Adrian Rollini in 1938.  The Tune Twisters performed in the 1937 Broadway production, Between the Devil, singing "Triplets." The production ran from December 22, 1937, to March 12, 1938 (93 performances). During the audition, the Tune Twisters were known as the Savoy Club Boys. Lathrop was a member of the Tune Twisters in 1939 when they recorded the first radio jingle of its kind for Pepsi – "Pepsi-Cola Hits the Spot" (aka "Nickel, Nickel"). The trio also performed in two 1935 films, Sweet Surrender and Melody Magic, the latter directed by Fred Waller. Gene Lantham, in 1940, replaced Lathrop, who went on to become guitarist and vocalist with Glenn Miller.

History 
Andy Love, Jack Lathrop, and Bob Wacker began singing as a trio around 1928 or 1929 while attending a prep school near New York. Lathrop attended college in New York and Wacker got a job. Around 1933, Love suggested – to Lathrop and Wacker – commercializing their trio. Their launch was unsuccessful, and Love, discouraged, began singing as a soloist with Paul Whiteman. Eventually, the three auditioned for NBC Radio. After the audition, an NBC executive asked, "What do you call yourselves?" "You sure are some tune twisters." Love responded with a grin, "That's our name."

The Tune Twisters made their radio broadcast debut in 1935 as guest artists on a show hosted by Ray Noble, who discovered them in a Westchester County roadhouse nightclub. They continued to work with Noble until he moved to Hollywood to form a new until for the Burns and Allen programs. The trio subsequently performed in vaudeville on their own. They also performed with Fred Allen and Rudy Vallée hours.

In 1938, the Tune Twisters signed with NBC to perform the for the Jell-O Summer Series, starring Jane Froman and her husband, Don Ross (né Donald McKaig Ross; 1899–1971), with the Alfonso D'Artega Orchestra. NBC's Red Network (radio) broadcast the show nationwide, beginning July 4, 1938. The show had previously been hosted by Jack Benny.

Members 
 

 Love was one of three children born to Andrew Jackson Love, M.D. (1861–1948), and Anita Florence Hemmings (née Annie Williamson Hemmings; 1872–1960).

 
 
 

 

 Gene re-married, on June 18, 1947, in Los Angeles, to Miriel Eloise King (maiden; 1917–2001). Dorothy re-married, on December 17, 1947, in Manhattan, to Andy Love.

 Gene Lanham and Dorothy Lanham – under the name Dorothy Lanham – and also Robert Wacker, sang as members of the Ralph Brewster singers on Frank Sinatra's 1957 recording, "Mistletoe and Holly." In the late 1950s and early 1960s, Lanham served on the board of the Los Angeles chapter of the American Federation of Television and Radio Artists. Lanham remarried – on June 18, 1947, in Los Angeles – to Miriel Eloise King (maiden; 1917–2001).

Selected broadcasts

Radio (1930s) 
 1940–1942: WOR; Ramona and the Tune Twisters – broadcast three times a week; sponsored by R&H Brewing Company – Rubsam & Hormann Brewing Co., found by Joseph Rubsam and August Horrmann in Staten Island. The sponsor was known for its theme song sang by the Tune Twisters, the "R&H Beer Song" (©1941), composed by Clarence Gaskill.

Jingles 
 1938: Pepsi-Cola Jingle (see also Sensory branding)
 "Pepsi-Cola Hits the Spot" (aka "Nickel, Nickel")
 The commercial, reportedly, aired over 1.5 million times

Broadway 
 1937: Between the Devil, the Tune Twisters sang "Triplets," December 22, 1937 – March 12, 1938 (93 performances); during the audition, the Tune Twisters were known as the Savoy Club Boys

Selected filmography and discography

Filmography 
 The Tune Twisters performed "Love Makes The World Go 'Round," in the 1935 film, Sweet Surrender – music by Dana Suesse, lyrics by Edward Heyman

Discography 

 The Tune Twisters
 
 matrix 38617
 
 matrix 38648
 Recorded September 13, 1934, New York
 Decca (matrix 38617)

 The Tune Twisters
 
 
 Decca 233 (matrix 38647)
 Recorded September 13, 1934, New York

 Victor Young and His Orchestra
 Hal Burke, vocal
 The Tune Twisters
 
 Recorded March 21, 1935
 Decca 426

 Victor Young and His Orchestra
 Featuring Hal Burke and the Tune Twisters
 
 From the 1935 film, Go Into Your Dance
 Decca 
 (audio via YouTube)

 Johnny Green and His Orchestra, with Marjory Logan (vocalist) and the Tune Twisters
 The songs:
 
 "I'm Yours" (Tune Twisters)
 "Body and Soul”
 "I Wanna Be Loved" (orchestra)
 
 
 
 Musicians: 2nd pianist (and arranger), Dave Terry
 From Melody Magic, musical film directed by Fred Waller
 (audio via YouTube)

 The Decca All Star Revue – 2 two-part productions:

 Recorded January 15, 1935, New York
 Part One: "You're the Top," Cole Porter, from Anything Goes
 Decca 
 Part Two: "You're the Top"
 Decca ; matrix 39253

 Recorded May 20, 1935, New York
 
 Decca ; matrix 39529
 
 Decca ; matrix 39530

 Tune Twisters
 
 Side A: "Triplets"
 Side B: "I'm Against Rhythm"
 (audio via YouTube)
 

 Adrian Rollini His Quintet
 
 Recorded June 23, 1938, New York
 
 (© 24 August 1938) Harry Bailey (né Harry Preston Bailey; 1909–1984) and Doris Fisher (w&m)
 
 (© 10 May 1938) Frank Loesser (words), Hoagy Carmichael (music)
 Vocalion 4212
 (Discogs reference)

 
 
 (© 8 June 1938) Bud Green (words), Albert Stillman (words), Claude Thornhill (music)
 
 
 (© 21 June 1938) Al Hoffman, Al Lewis, Murray Mencher (de) (1898–1991) (w&m)

 Victor Salon Orchestra, Nathaniel Shilkret (conductor)
 
 Recorded June 5, 1940
 Victor BS-051230
 "Hello, 'Frisco!" 	 
 Victor BS-051232
 Recorded June 5, 1940

 
 
 Matrix 73578
 
 Matrix 73577
 Decca 18902
 Recorded May 17, 1946

Notes and references

Notes

References 

20th-century American singers
American musical trios
Decca Records artists
Musical groups established in 1933
Musical groups from New York City
Traditional pop music singers
Vocal trios